Bhaba Ranjan Reang is an Indian politician and elected member of the Tripura Tribal Areas Autonomous District Council (TTAADC). Reang was elected from the Damcherra-Jampui constituency in North Tripura district.

References 

Tripura politicians
People from North Tripura district
Tripuri people
Living people
Year of birth missing (living people)